John Frazer (born 1945, Lancashire, England) is a British architectural academic.

Frazer's early work in computer technologies related to architecture, urbanism and design was developed at the Architectural Association in London, Cambridge University and the University of Ulster (where he was awarded a personal Chair in 1984). He has been Swire Chair Professor, Head of the School of Design and Director of the Design Technology Research Centre at the Hong Kong Polytechnic University and Head of the School of Design at Queensland University of Technology (QUT) in Brisbane, Australia. He is Professor of Digital Design at The European Graduate School.

Publication

Frazer J.H., An Evolutionary Architecture, Architectural Association, London, 1995

References

External links

Personal Web site http://www.johnfrazer.com/

20th-century English architects
1945 births
Living people
Academic staff of Queensland University of Technology
21st-century English architects
Architects from Lancashire